Ilminism, frequently translated as the One-People Principle, One-People Doctrine, or Unidemism, was the political ideology of South Korea under its first President, Syngman Rhee. The Ilminist principle has been likened by contemporary scholars to the Nazi ideal of the Herrenvolk (master race) and was part of an effort to consolidate a united and obedient citizenry around Rhee's strong central leadership through appeals to ultranationalism and ethnic supremacy. In general, Ilminists often refers to pro-Syngman Rhee (groups).

History 
The concept had deep roots in disputes between different members of the Korean independence movement during Japanese rule. The debate was between so-called culturalists(문화주의론자), who argued that Korean backwardness required a strong and patriotic elite to guide the people into cultural civilization and enlightenment, that is, the Koreans needed to become a proper nation, versus the populists(민중투쟁론자), who maintained that the Koreans were already a sovereign nation and people from whom all legitimacy ultimately derived. Ilminism had been identified as being influenced by the culturalist stream of Korean thinking.

The concept was developed primarily by German-educated Minister of Education Ahn Ho-sang, who studied philosophy at the University of Jena in Germany during the late 1920s. It was connected with the National Defense Student Corps (NDSC), established on 22 April 1949. The nationalist doctrine was influenced by the statist youth groups Ahn had witnessed both as a student in Germany back in the 1920s as well as during the Asia-Pacific War. The doctrine was received unfavorably by various quarters when it first surfaced, but the onset of the Korean War in 1950 substantially increased its rapport with authorities.

Ideology
Ilminism starts from the assumption that the Korean people are a genetically, spiritually, and culturally homogeneous people from ancient times.

However, this national identity has been undermined by external forces and their collaborators, and capitalists and communists play such a role today. The Korean people must fight against this by restoring the unity they have maintained for many years.

The Ilminist Principle became the central ideology of Rhee's National Association and its successor, the Liberal Party, established in 1951.

Ilminism was based around a four-point political program, including elimination of formal discrimination between the nobility and the masses, the economic equalization of rich and poor through land reform, social and political equality of the sexes, and an end to discrimination between North and South or the urban capital and the rural provinces. An end to partisan politics was posited, in favor of a united people behind a de facto one-party state.

Ilminism was effective in creating a strong anti-communist nationalism to stand in juxtaposition to the effective appeals to nationalism made through the Democratic Front for the Reunification of the Fatherland, headed by Kim Il Sung and the communist Workers' Party of Korea.

Syngman Rhee and Ilminists supported conservative-nationalism based on anti-Japanese and anti-Chinese sentiment, but Rhee had less nationalist perception of the United States and rather had a 'pro-American sadaejuui' (친미 사대주의) perception. This contrasts with Kim Gu, a consistent right-wing 'nationalist' (민족주의).

Northward reunification 
The Ilminists were belligerent anti-communists. Despite U.S. opposition, they insisted on "Northward reunification" (북진통일), in which South Korean troops marched North, overthrew the North Korean government on the Korean Peninsula, completely eliminated communist forces, and occupied all areas of the peninsula by force to build a non-communist unified-ROK.

Ilminism Supplies Association 
The Illminist Supplies Association is a nationalist organization founded in September 1949. The organization is an organization aimed at promoting popularism centered on Rhee Syng-man, led by former members of the Korean National Youth Association led by Lee Bum-seok and Ahn Ho-sang. ISA criticized both capitalism and communism, but basically, the organization had a pro-American tendency, and due to the intensifying Cold War, anti-capitalism tendency was not more prominent than during the KNYA period.

See also
 Korean ethnic nationalism
 Korean National Youth Association
 Corporatism

Footnotes

Further reading

Syngman Rhee
Authoritarianism
Anti-Chinese sentiment in South Korea
Anti-communism in South Korea
Anti-Japanese sentiment in South Korea
Anti-North Korean sentiment in South Korea
Confucian political parties
Corporatism
Conservatism in South Korea
Far-right politics in South Korea
Fascism in South Korea
Hongik Ingan
Identity politics in Korea
 
Korean Confucianism
Korean nationalism
National conservatism
Political history of South Korea
Political ideologies
Racism in South Korea
Right-wing ideologies
Right-wing populism in South Korea
Sadaejuui
Social conservatism
State ideologies
Three Principles of the People